Joaquín Espert Pérez-Caballero (born 11 September 1938) is a Spanish politician and former President of La Rioja between 1987 and 1990.

References

Presidents of La Rioja (Spain)
People's Alliance (Spain) politicians
People's Party (Spain) politicians
Living people
1938 births